Diamond Shumsher Rana (5 July 1918 – 11 March 2011) was a Nepali writer and political activist known for his acclaimed novels Basanti and Seto Bagh.

Life and career
He was born at Tansen Durbar in Palpa, where his grandfather, Sher Shumsher Jung Bahadur Rana, was governor. His father Buddha Shumsher Jung Bahadur Rana was a colonel in the Royal Nepal Army. Rana enjoyed a privileged upbringing and was a captain in the Royal Nepal Army.

In 1948 Rana travelled to Benaras, India and had his first novel Basanti published. In Nepal, he had aligned himself with an anti-establishment faction of the Rana regime and was arrested, court-martialled and sentenced to death but was later freed after members of the Rana family pressured the regime for his release. Rana later joined the political opposition and was a member of the Nepali Congress Party from 1954 to 1987.

Bibliography
 Basanti (1948)
 Seto Bagh (1970)
 Anita
 Griha Prabesh
 Satprayas (Sequel to Seto Bagh)
 Pratibaddha
 Dhanko Dhabba

References

1918 births
2011 deaths
People from Palpa District
Nepalese male writers
Nepali-language writers
Nepalese male novelists
Nepalese politicians
20th-century novelists
Jagadamba Shree Puraskar winners